Malotaranivka is an urban-type settlement in Kramatorsk Raion in Donetsk Oblast of eastern Ukraine. Population:

Demographics
Native language as of the Ukrainian Census of 2001:
 Ukrainian 68.76%
 Russian 30.76%
 Armenian 0.72%
 Belarusian 0.18%
 Moldovan (Romanian) 0.05%

References

Urban-type settlements in Kramatorsk Raion